The Spirit's in It is the fifth studio album by American singer Patti LaBelle. It was released by Philadelphia International Records on August 28, 1981 in the United States, her first with the label.

Background
Patti LaBelle embarked on a solo career in 1977, shortly after the split of the girl group Labelle. Her first solo album, a self-titled affair, was critically acclaimed and also found commercial success. However, her three follow-ups for Epic failed to match that album's momentum, despite some charted singles. When her fourth album, Released, failed to generate a significant R&B or pop hit, she agreed to sign with Philadelphia International Records, which had been known to provide hits for veteran artists such as The O'Jays, Lou Rawls and Billy Paul.

With the help of Kenny Gamble and Leon Huff, her frequent collaborator James Ellison and PIR staff producers such as Dexter Wansel and Cecil Womack, LaBelle produced The Spirit's in It, which included her forays into other genres such as country, rock and reggae. Among the notable singles from the album included her cover of the boogie-woogie hit, "Rocking Pneumonia and the Boogie-Woogie Flu", the club hit title track, "Family", "Shoot Him on Sight" (her first collaboration with songwriters Cynthia Biggs and Dexter Wansel) and "Over the Rainbow", the latter track becoming her solo cover of a tune she had previously recorded as member of Patti LaBelle and the Blue Belles in the sixties. LaBelle had been performing the song in concert after embarking on her solo career. The new recording was listed as the b-side of the single "Family" and became a standout in LaBelle's career, quickly becoming a signature song for LaBelle. This album would precede her commercial breakthrough a couple years later with the album, I'm in Love Again.

Track listing

Personnel 
 Patti LaBelle – lead vocals, backing vocals (1, 2, 4-9)
 Joel Bryant – keyboards (1)
 Lenny Pakula – organ (1, 3, 4)
 Dexter Wansel – arrangements (1, 8), synthesizers (8)
 James Budd Ellison – keyboards (2, 5, 7, 9), arrangements (2, 5, 7, 9), backing vocals (5, 7)
 Philip Woo – keyboards (2, 9)
 Leon A. Huff – acoustic piano (3, 4, 6), Fender Rhodes (3, 4), arrangements (3, 4, 6), backing vocals (6), BGV arrangements (6)
 Nathaniel Wilkie – keyboards (5, 7), acoustic piano (5, 7), organ (5, 7), synthesizers (5, 7)
 Cynthia Biggs – acoustic piano (8)
 Dennis Harris – guitar (1)
 Cecil Womack – guitar (1, 3, 4, 6), backing vocals (6)
 Edward Levon Batts – guitar (2, 9), backing vocals (2, 7)
 Herb Smith – guitar (2, 5, 7-9), backing vocals (5, 7, 9)
 Bobby Bennett – acoustic guitar (6)
 Marc Rubin – guitar (8)
 Roy Smith – guitar (8)
 Jimmy Williams – bass (1-5, 9)
 Derrick Graves – bass (6)
 Idress "Skeets" Young – bass (8)
 Quinton Joseph – drums (1, 3, 4, 6)
 John Ingram – drums (5, 7, 9), backing vocals (5, 7, 9)
 Clifford "Pete" Rudd – drums (8)
 Vincent Montana Jr. – orchestral bells (3), vibraphone (3)
 Miguel Fuentes – percussion (5, 7, 8)
 Michael Mee – alto saxophone (1)
 Ralph Olson – alto saxophone (1)
 Bob Malach – tenor saxophone (1)
 Michael Pedicin Jr. – tenor saxophone (1)
 Willie Williams – soprano saxophone (5), tenor saxophone (5)
 Sam Peake – saxophone (9)
 Larry Gittins – trumpet (1)
 Bobby Rush – harmonica (6)
 MFSB – horns (2, 8, 9), strings (2, 3, 8, 9)
 Jack Faith – arrangements (3)
 Carl Helm – backing vocals (2, 7, 9)
 Reggie Workman – backing vocals (2, 9)
 Kenneth Gamble – backing vocals (5, 7)

Handclaps on "Family"
 Miguel Fuentes
 Stacey Todd Holt
 Norman Maxon
 Fred Murphy
 Vivian Reed 
 Idress "Skeets" Young

Production 
 Kenneth Gamble – executive producer 
 Leon A. Huff – executive producer 
 Dirk Devlin – engineer 
 Arthur Stoppe – engineer 
 Joseph Tarsia – engineer 
 Michael Tarsia – assistant engineer 
 Vince Warsavage – assistant engineer 
 Jean Scott – A&R coordinator 
 Paula Scher – art direction, design 
 Rebecca Blake – photography 
 Mastered at Frankford/Wayne Mastering Labs (Philadelphia, Pennsylvania).

Charts

Album chart usages for Billboard200
Album chart usages for BillboardRandBHipHop

References

1981 albums
Patti LaBelle albums
Philadelphia International Records albums
Albums produced by Kenneth Gamble
Albums produced by Leon Huff
Albums recorded at Sigma Sound Studios